National Geographic Wild is a Pan-European pay television channel that features documentaries produced by the National Geographic Society. It features documentaries about nature, wildlife, natural phenomenon, and earth. The channel replaced Adventure One in Europe on 1 March 2007.

History 
The channel was launched as Nat Geo Wild on 1 March 2007, replacing Adventure One. The Romanian version of the channel was launched on July 1, 2009 and on 30th September 2019, it launched its HD feed. The channel launched its own high-definition feed in the UK and Ireland on 1 April 2009.

In the Netherlands, the HD feed was launched on 14 October 2010 through Caiway, later followed by KPN (8 February 2011), Glashart Media (14 April 2011), Ziggo (1 September 2011) and UPC Netherlands (1 October 2013).

Nat Geo Wild was rebranded as National Geographic Wild on 1 February 2019.

On 20 March 2019, The Walt Disney Company acquired 21st Century Fox, including Fox Networks Group.

Programming

See also
Nat Geo Wild
National Geographic Channel
National Geographic Society

References

External links 
 Official Website Bulgaria
 Official Website Denmark
 Official Website Germany
 Official Website Greece & Cyprus
 Official Website Romania
 Official Website Russia
 Official Website Turkey
 Official Website Ukraine
 Official Website United Kingdom & Ireland

Television channels in Belgium
Television channels in Flanders
Television channels in the Netherlands
Television channels in the United Kingdom
Television channels and stations established in 2007
Europe
Television channels in North Macedonia